James Russell (March 31, 1918 – September 3, 1977) was a Canadian ice hockey player.

Early life 
Russell, a native of Hamilton, Ontario, played junior hockey in Guelph, Ontario. After junior, played hockey in the Maritimes, with the Saint John Beavers, Glace Bay Miners, and North Sydney Victorias. He then served in the Canadian Army during World War II, playing on Army hockey teams in Vancouver and Toronto.

Career 
As a member of the Sudbury Wolves, he was a member of the 1938 Team Canada that won a gold medal at the 1938 World Ice Hockey Championships in Prague. Russell also captained the Wolves team that won a silver medal at the 1949 World Ice Hockey Championships in Stockholm, Sweden. He also played professionally with the Buffalo Bisons, St. Louis Flyers of the American Hockey League (in the 1944–45 season) as well as the New Westminster Royals in the Pacific Coast Hockey League (1947–48 season).

References

1918 births
1977 deaths
Canadian ice hockey right wingers